This is a list of nicknames in the sport of ice hockey. Most are related to professional ice hockey such as the National Hockey League. A few notable nicknames from the Canadian major junior hockey leagues, the U.S. colleges, and national teams are excluded.

Players
The following are hockey players listed by their last name along with nicknames. Players listed in bold are still active.

Teams

The origins of nicknames (if known) are noted below. Several of the above are simply shortened names or plays on the current team name or jersey.

"Bay Street Bullies" - Toronto Maple Leafs: a play on Philadelphia Flyers' Broad Street Bullies. Originally used by the line composed of Gary Roberts, Shayne Corson and Darcy Tucker due to their gritty style of play and because the team arena is located on Bay Street.
"Big Bad Bruins" - Boston Bruins: During the late 1960s and early 1970s, the Bruins were known for their physical style of play as well as their success. During recent years, similarities have revived the name.
"Broad Street Bullies" – Philadelphia Flyers: during the team's Stanley Cup runs during the 1970s, their home ice was the Spectrum on Broad Street in South Philadelphia and the team was noted for its physical play. The team currently plays in the Wells Fargo Center (which is also on Broad Street).
"Buds" – Toronto Maple Leafs: probably based on the team's use of a leaf as a logo, particularly the secondary logo which includes more tiny lobes than is common in most actual maple leaves - bearing a resemblance to other plants which are known for their buds.
Bunch of Jerks - Carolina Hurricanes: During the success of the unusual post game celebration called the "Storm Surge", many Canadian outlets called the practice "unhockey like" which led to Don Cherry on Hockey Night in Canada to call the 'Canes "a Bunch of Jerks" which Carolina took in stride.
"Cats" - Florida Panthers: the Panther is a cat.
"Golden Misfits" - Vegas Golden Knights: In reference to the expansion team status of the Golden Knights, the term was coined by one of its players Ryan Reaves.
"Les Glorieux" (French, "The Glorious Ones") – Montreal Canadiens
"Hogs" - Toronto Maple Leafs: based on Toronto's nickname Hogtown.
"The Katanas" - Buffalo Sabres: based on the team (Tokyo Katanas) the imaginary player Taro Tsujimoto was drafted from in 1974 by then Sabres' GM Punch Imlach, Katanas being an approximation for "Sabres" in the Japanese language.
"The ManBearPigs" - Minnesota Wild: in reference to the ambiguity of the team's logo as to what animal it depicts. It is a reference to the South Park episode of the same name.
"The 'Notes" - St. Louis Blues: abbreviation of "Bluenotes".
"'Nucks" – Vancouver Canucks: abbreviation of "Canucks". (local press and fans)
"Les Rouges" – Montreal Canadiens: after the red colour of their jerseys.
"Slugs" - Buffalo Sabres: a disparaging nickname derived from their logo, which resembles a cross between a buffalo and a slug.
"Swords" - Buffalo Sabres: a nickname derived from their title, the "sabres", which is a sword.
"Sabs", Sabes - Buffalo Sabres: abbreviation of the name "Sabres".
"Le Tricolore" (French, "The Tricolour") – Montreal Canadiens: after the flag of France, which has the same colour scheme (blue-white-red).
"Southern Stars" - Dallas Stars: as opposed to the North Stars, who they replaced.
"Tomales" – Toronto Maple Leafs: taken from the first two letters of the team's full name ('TO'ronto 'MA'aple 'LE'afS).
"Dead Wings" - Detroit Red Wings: nickname given by the rivaled Hawks fans. It can also describe the "Dead Wings" era of the Red Wings during the 80s.
"La sainte flanelle" (French, "The Holy Flannel") - Montreal Canadiens : Maurice Richard came back on the ice after being cut to the head to score the Stanley Cup winning goal against Boston Bruins in 1953.  His jersey was full of blood.

Defunct teams

Arenas
This is a list of hockey arena nicknames and their home teams; nicknames are often merely abbreviations of the full name; otherwise, the origin of the nickname (if known) is noted.
"The Aud" – Buffalo Memorial Auditorium, Buffalo, New York; former home of the Buffalo Sabres (1970–1996)
"The Bank"" - Scotiabank Place, Ottawa, Ontario; current home of the Ottawa Senators (1996-); as in 'two points in the bank' and reference to corporate sponsor
"The Barn" – Windsor Arena, Windsor, Ontario; as Border Cities Arena, the former home of the Detroit Cougars (1926–1927); in reference to its appearance
"The Bat Cave" – Luedecke Arena, Austin, Texas, home of the Austin Ice Bats; in reference to the home team
"The Big Mac" – McNichols Sports Arena, Denver, Colorado; former home of the Denver Spurs (1975–1976), the Colorado Rockies (1976–1982), and the Colorado Avalanche (1995–1999)
"The Bulb" – Philips Arena, Atlanta, Georgia, home of the Atlanta Thrashers; in reference to the arena's sponsor Philips's major products, lightbulbs.
"The Can" - Pepsi Center, Denver, Colorado, home of the Colorado Avalanche, the Denver Nuggets, the Colorado Mammoth and the Colorado Crush; in reference to the arena's sponsor. Now named Ball Arena, after the Ball Corporation, a canning company.
"The Checkerdome" - St. Louis Arena, St. Louis, Missouri, former home of the St. Louis Blues and the St. Louis Eagles.  Now demolished. This was in reference to Ralston Purina, who owned the team for a period of time.  Also referred to as "The Barn", due to its decrepit appearance and its former function as an indoor agricultural center and use for horse fairs.
"The Coliseum" - Nassau Veterans Memorial Coliseum, Long Island, New York; former home of the New York Islanders (1972-2015, 2018-2021)
"The Dome" – Scotiabank Saddledome, Calgary, Alberta; home of the Calgary Flames; a play on the name "Saddledome"
"The DoughJoe" - Little Caesars Arena, Detroit, Michigan; home of the Detroit Red Wings; a play on the name dojo and its title sponsor Little Caesars.
"Fort Neverlose" – Nassau Veterans Memorial Coliseum, Uniondale, New York; former home of the New York Islanders from 1972-2015, 2018-2021; a reference to the Islanders dominance on home ice during the '80s dynasty
"The Fortress" - T-Mobile Arena, Las Vegas, Nevada; home of the Vegas Golden Knights; keeping in line with the medieval theme of the team, this name is used to refer to the arena as a nod to fortresses of the Middle Ages.
"The Effin Center" – First Niagara Center, Buffalo, New York; home of the Buffalo Sabres; a play on First Niagara's initials, F.N. Currently named KeyBank Center.
"The Farg" – Wells Fargo Center, Philadelphia, Pennsylvania; home of the Philadelphia Flyers, a nickname popularized on twitter and subsequently adopted by staff.
"F.U. Center" – First Union Center, former name of the Wells Fargo Center, Philadelphia, Pennsylvania; home of the Philadelphia Flyers, a play on the euphemism "F You!"
"The Garage" – GM Place, former name of Rogers Arena, Vancouver, British Columbia; home of the Vancouver Canucks; a reference to the arena's former sponsor, vehicle manufacturer General Motors
"The Gahden" - TD Banknorth Garden or Boston Garden, Boston; Home of the Boston Bruins
"The Garden" – Madison Square Garden, New York City, New York; home of the New York Rangers
"The Hangar" – Air Canada Centre, Toronto, Ontario; home of the Toronto Maple Leafs; a reference to the arena's sponsor, Air Canada.  Also refers to American Airlines Center in Dallas, Texas, home of the Dallas Stars.
"Hockeytown" – Joe Louis Arena, Detroit, Michigan; home of the Detroit Red Wings
"The House that Al Built" - Nassau Veterans Memorial Coliseum, Long Island, New York; home of the New York Islanders; a reference to the legendary coach, Al Arbour.
"The House that Gretzky Built" - Northlands Coliseum, Edmonton, Alberta; former home of the Edmonton Oilers; a reference to legendary Oiler Wayne Gretzky, who won all four of his Stanley Cups during his tenure with the Oilers in the 1980s, when the Oilers called the Coliseum their home.
"The House that Rusty Built" - Honda Center, Anaheim, California; home of the Anaheim Ducks; a reference to fan favourite Ruslan Salei.
"The Ice Palace" - (now known as the Amalie Arena) Tampa, Florida; original name of the Tampa Bay Lightning's arena. Local fans frequently still call it that.
"The Igloo" – Mellon Arena, Pittsburgh, Pennsylvania; the former home of the Pittsburgh Penguins from 1967 until 2010; a reference to how the arena from the outside looks like an igloo. Also a reference to ice and cold, despite igloos being arctic and penguins being Antarctic. "The Igloo" was closed on June 26, 2010, and underwent a six-month demolition process that was completed on March 31, 2012.
"JLA" – Joe Louis Arena, Detroit, Michigan; home of the Detroit Red Wings
"The Joe" – Joe Louis Arena, Detroit, Michigan; home of the Detroit Red Wings
"Kålleseum" - Scandinavium, Gothenburg, Sweden, home of the Frölunda Indians; pronounced exactly like Colosseum, Kålle is a fictional character associated with inhabitants of Gothenburg where the arena is located.
"MSG" – Madison Square Garden, New York City, New York; home of the New York Rangers
"The Madhouse on Madison (Street)" – Chicago Stadium, Chicago, Illinois; former (1929–1994) home of the Chicago Blackhawks; from the noise attributed to the fabled Barton organ that was played during hockey games there. Inherited by the subsequent arena, United Center.
'The Mall" - Hartford Civic Center, Hartford, Connecticut; former home of the Hartford Whalers, named due to the fact that the arena was attached to a shopping mall.
"The Mausoleum" - Nassau Veterans Memorial Coliseum, Long Island, New York; home of the New York Islanders A Pejorative alluding to the Coliseum quality & condition as viewed by fans of rival teams, typically those in the mid atlantic division.
"The Marina" – KeyBank Center, Buffalo, New York; home of the Buffalo Sabres; a portmanteau of "Marine Midland Arena", its former name
"The Meadowlands" or "Meadowlands Arena" – former name that the fans and the media still reference to the Continental Airlines Arena (now the Izod Center), East Rutherford, New Jersey; former home of the New Jersey Devils
"The Old Red Barn" – Detroit Olympia, Detroit, Michigan; former (1927–1986) home of the Detroit Red Wings; from its appearance
"The Phil" – Philips Arena, Atlanta, Georgia, home of the Atlanta Thrashers
"The Phone Booth" - Verizon Center, Washington, DC; home of the Washington Capitals; from it being named after a phone company; also used by MTS Center, Winnipeg, home of the Winnipeg Jets, for the same reason.
"The Pond, Ponda Center" - Honda Center, Anaheim, California; home of the Anaheim Ducks; a reference to both the team and the arena's original name, Arrowhead Pond.
"The Rat Trap" – Miami Arena, Miami, Florida; former home of the Florida Panthers; from the fact the fans littered the ice with plastic rats in the 1996 playoffs.  Based on an incident involving Scott Mellanby and a live rat found in the locker room.
"The Rock" - Prudential Center, Newark, New Jersey; home of the New Jersey Devils; from Prudential's prior advertising campaign encouraging others to "own a piece of the rock".
"The Shark Tank" – SAP Center at San Jose, San Jose, California; home of the San Jose Sharks; a reference to the team's name or "The Cow Palace" - a reference to the Sharks original home, as they once played in the California State Livestock Pavilion in Daly City prior to the construction of their new arena in San Jose. The Cow Palace was unique as it was the only building to host a professional sports franchise with extensive stable and barn facilities for animal events, which are used for the annual Grand National Rodeo and occasionally for other events.
"Hockeywood" - Staples Center, Los Angeles, California; home of the Los Angeles Kings.
"Smashville" - Bridgestone Arena, Nashville, Tennessee; home of the Nashville Predators.
"The Swamp" - Continental Airlines Arena (now the Izod Center), East Rutherford, New Jersey; former home of the New Jersey Devils; a reference to the swampy area it sits on.
"The Thunderdome" - St. Petersburg, Florida; nickname of Florida Suncoast Dome (now known as Tropicana Field and the current home of the Tampa Bay Rays), where the Tampa Bay Lightning played before the "Ice Palace" (now known as Tampa Times Forum) was built in Tampa. Reference to the high incidents of lightning strikes in the area, it's a dome and a play on the team's name (Lightning), as well as a reference to the 1985 film Mad Max Beyond Thunderdome
"The UC" - United Center, Chicago, Illinois; Home of the Chicago Blackhawks (1994–Present)
"The White House" – Winnipeg Arena, Winnipeg, Manitoba; former home of the Winnipeg Jets (1972–1996) and the Manitoba Moose (1996–2004); named for the Winnipeg White Out, where Winnipeg fans would wear white clothing for an attention-grabbing "Sea of White" effect
"The World's Most Famous Arena" – Madison Square Garden, New York City, New York; home of the New York Rangers.
"The 'X'" – Xcel Energy Center, Saint Paul, Minnesota; home of the Minnesota Wild
"The Old Barn, The Arena" - The Arena, St. Louis, Missouri, home of the St. Louis Eagles 1934–35, St. Louis Blues from 1967 to 1994
"The Fort" - K-Rock Centre, Kingston, Ontario, home of the Kingston Frontenacs; in reference to the remaining walls of Fort Frontenac beside the arena
"The U," "The Stabe" -UBS Arena, the current home of the New York Islanders.

See also

Nickname
List of ice hockey linemates
List of athletes by nickname
List of monarchs by nickname
 Lists of nicknames – nickname list articles on Wikipedia

Notes and references
508 Hank Hersch Knock On Wood

The Maple Leafs feel lucky to have Dave Andreychuk, a.k.a. Wood, who takes lots of licks but scores lots of goals

Nicknames
Ice Hockey
Ice hockey